Bhanu Sri Mehra is an Indian actress who has appeared in Telugu, Tamil and Punjabi films.

Career
Hailing from Amritsar, Punjab, Bhanu Sri finished her schooling in Dehradun, Uttarakhand and moved to Mumbai, Maharashtra to pursue her graduation in Mass Media. She then started modelling for commercials and print ads.

She made her debut in Gunasekhar's Varudu, which featured her alongside Allu Arjun and Arya. Prior to release, the film opted not to show any promotional material of Bhanu Sri to keep in line with the film, where Allu Arjun's character only sees her face at their wedding. The film opened to mixed reviews and was a box office bomb. The film's failure meant that she went unnoticed and did not get a lead role in a high-profile Telugu film subsequently. Before Varudu, she had done a cameo in the Bollywood film Bachna Ae Haseeno.

Bhanu Sri later went on to play the second lead in the Tamil film Udhayan alongside Arulnithi and Pranitha, which failed to achieve success, too. While she appeared in secondary characters mostly in low-profile Telugu and Tamil films in the following years, she landed starring roles in three films in the Punjabi language, her mother tongue. She also shot for a Hindi film titled Boyss Toh Boyss Hain. Several Telugu projects, including Chilkur Balaji, Prematho Cheppana, Maharaja Sri Galigadu, Lingadu-Ramalingadu, and Antha Nee Mayalone, all films she had started filming for, did not see a theatrical release. In 2015, she signed up a new Tamil film, Simba, which would see her playing a news reporter. She has completed her first Kannada film, Deal Raja, too.

Filmography

References

External links
 

Living people
Actresses in Telugu cinema
Actresses in Tamil cinema
Actresses in Punjabi cinema
Indian film actresses
Actresses from Amritsar
21st-century Indian actresses
Actresses in Kannada cinema
Year of birth missing (living people)